Alleghany County Schools is the school district serving Alleghany County, North Carolina. Its four schools serve 1,558 students as of the 2010–11 school year.

Student demographics
For the 2010–11 school year, Alleghany County Schools had a total population of 1,558 students and 123.80 teachers on a (FTE) basis. This produced a student-teacher ratio of 12.58:1. That same year, out of the student total, the gender ratio was 49% male to 51% female. The demographic group makeup was: White, 84%; Hispanic, 13%; Black, 1%; American Indian, 0%; and Asian/Pacific Islander, 0% (two or more races: 2%). For the same school year, 68.42% of the students received free and reduced-cost lunches.

Governance
The primary governing body of Alleghany County Schools follows a council–manager government format with a five-member Board of Education appointing a Superintendent to run the day-to-day operations of the system. The school system currently resides in the North Carolina State Board of Education's Seventh District.

Board of Education
The five-member Alleghany County Schools Board of Education meets on the second Tuesday of every month. The current members of the board are: Donna Rea (Chair), Amy Bottomley (Vice-Chair), Rick Wooten, Steve Carpenter, and Jason Williams.

Superintendent
The current superintendent is Dr. Chad Beasley, who has held the position since 2015.

Member schools
Alleghany County Schools has four schools ranging from pre-kindergarten to twelfth grade. Those four schools are separated into one high school, and three elementary schools which handle the pre-k through eighth grades.

High school
 Alleghany High School (Sparta)

Elementary schools
 Glade Creek Elementary School (Ennice)
 Piney Creek Elementary School (Piney Creek)
 Sparta Elementary School (Sparta)

See also
 List of school districts in North Carolina

References

External links
 

Education in Alleghany County, North Carolina
School districts in North Carolina